Radhakamal Mukerjee (1889–1968), a leading thinker and social scientist of modern India, was Professor of Economics and Sociology and Vice-Chancellor of the University of Lucknow.  Mukerjee played an important and constructive role in the Indian independence movement.  He was a highly original philosopher of history and a discerning interpreter of culture and civilization and a 1962 recipient of the third highest Indian civilian honour of the Padma Bhushan.

Formative years
Mukerjee was the son of a barrister in Baharampur, West Bengal, a city located some 185 km north of Kolkata.  He grew up in a household with a scholarly focus and a library devoted to history, literature, the law and Sanskrit texts.  After attending Krishnanagar College, he gained an academic scholarship to Presidency College, under the University of Calcutta.  He earned his honours degrees in English and History.

Literary works
Mukerjee opened the discourse of the Ashtavakra Gita into English with his posthumous work published in 1971.

Early life
Mukherjees theory of society sought to explain the values of civilization.
In sense, Radhakamal was a pioneer of transdisciplinary approach in science.

Work
Radhakamal Mukerjee emphasized interdisciplinary disciplinary approach towards the understanding of life.
Mukerjee sought to break the barriers between physical sciences and sciences relating to persons aspects.
Mukerjee was a pioneer of Sociology in the 1900s.

Notes

References
 Radhakamal Mukerjee, India: The Dawn of a New Era: An Autobiography Radha Publ. (1997)  
    Radhakamal Mukerjee at WorldCat

1889 births
1968 deaths
Bengali people
People from Murshidabad district
Presidency University, Kolkata alumni
20th-century Indian economists
20th-century Indian philosophers
Indian sociologists
University of Calcutta alumni
Academic staff of the University of Lucknow
Philosophers of history
20th-century Indian historians
Recipients of the Padma Bhushan in science & engineering
Scholars from West Bengal